Orgyia definita, the definite tussock moth or definite-marked tussock moth, is a moth of the family Erebidae. It was first described by Alpheus Spring Packard in 1865. The species is found in eastern North America from Minnesota to New Brunswick and south to South Carolina, Mississippi, and Louisiana.

The wingspan is about 30 mm for males; females are wingless. Adult males are brown with a darker pattern and some white markings.

The larvae feed on Salix, Quercus, Tilia, Ulmus, Betula, Acer rubrum, and Hamamelis virginiana. They have a yellow head, prothoracic plate and dorsal glands. The body is covered in whitish hairs and the verrucae (wart-like structures on the body) are pale yellow.

References

Moths described in 1865
Lymantriinae
Moths of North America